2007 in television may refer to:
 2007 in American television for television related events in the United States.
 2007 in Australian television for television related events in Australia.
 2007 in Belgian television for television related events in Belgium.
 2007 in Brazilian television for television related events in Brazil.
 2007 in British television for television related events in Great Britain.
 2007 in Scottish television for television related events in Scotland.
 2007 in Canadian television for television related events in Canada.
 2007 in Croatian television for television related events in Croatia.
 2007 in Danish television for television related events in Denmark.
 2007 in Dutch television for television related events in the Netherlands.
 2007 in Estonian television for television related events in Estonia.
 2007 in French television for television related events in France.
 2007 in German television for television related events in Germany.
 2007 in Irish television for television related events in Ireland.
 2007 in Italian television for television related events in Italy.
 2007 in Japanese television for television related events in Japan.
 2007 in New Zealand television for television related events in New Zealand.
 2007 in Norwegian television for television related events in Norway.
 2007 in Pakistani television for television related events in Pakistan.
 2007 in Philippine television for television related events in the Philippines.
 2007 in Polish television for television related events in Poland.
 2007 in Portuguese television for television related events in Portugal.
 2007 in South African television for television related events in South Africa.
 2007 in Spanish television for television related events in Spain.
 2007 in Swedish television for television related events in Sweden.

 
Mass media timelines by year